Ranger Peak may refer to any of several mountain peaks:
 Ranger Peak (California), a mountain in California, USA
 Ranger Peak (Idaho), a mountain peak on the Idaho–Montana border, USA
 Ranger Peak, a mountain in Franklin Mountains State Park in El Paso, Texas, USA
 Ranger Peak (Wyoming), in Grand Teton National Park, Wyoming, USA